Zee Kannada is an Indian Kannada language general entertainment network that is owned by Zee Entertainment Enterprises. This is a list of the programmes broadcast by Kannada General Entertainment Channel Zee Kannada.

Current broadcasts

Original series

Reality shows

Dubbed series

Former broadcasts

Drama series

 Jothe Jotheyali
 Sose Thanda Sowbhagya
 Asambhava
 Jogula

Dubbed series

 Gangaa
 Aatma Bandhana

Reality shows
 Sa Re Ga Ma Pa Championship (Season 1 - 18)
 Drama Juniors
 Super Queen
 Golden Gang
 Kass Ge Toss
 Oggarane Dabbi
 Dance Karnataka Dance (Season 1 - 5)
 Comedy Khiladigalu 
 Comedy Khiladigalu Championship
 Life Super Guru
 Kuniyonu Baara
 Yariguntu Yarigilla (Season 1, 2)
 Chota Champion (Season 1, 2)
 Mane Mane Mahalakshmi
 Genes
 Challenge

Zee Kannada